The Chinese Methodist Church in Australia is based in Melbourne. 

The theology of the Church is in line with Methodism worldwide. It is Wesleyan in theology and its liturgy contains both traditional and contemporary services.

The Church was started by members from the Methodist Churches of Malaysia and Singapore who were either sent to Australia or emigrated there. It is found in all the major cities of Australia. 

It was originally known as the Methodist Church in Australia but disagreement rose over its name with the Uniting Church in Australia, with the latter refusing to allow its entry into the World Methodist Council. To solve this disagreement, the name was changed to the Chinese Methodist Church in Australia and after the Uniting Church in Australia dropped its veto, it was subsequently welcomed into the World Methodist Council.

The first bishop was the Reverend, Dr. James Ha, who was elected to office on 28 November 2002, when the Annual Conference was officially formed. The second bishop was the Reverend, Dr. Albert Chiew, who was elected to the office on 28 November 2006. On 25 November 2010, the Reverend Dr. James Kwang was elected as the third bishop; he was re-elected on 27 November 2014. On the 23 November 2018, Rev. Dr. Albert Wong was elected as the fourth bishop. The outgoing bishop after serving two terms step aside for the election of the new bishop. Bishop Dr. James Kwang was conferred bishop emeritus by the Annual Conference on the same day.

Affiliations
National Council of Churches in Australia
World Methodist Council
World Federation of Chinese Methodist Churches

External links
 Chinese Methodist Church in Australia - official website

Asian-Australian culture in Melbourne
Methodism in Australia
Chinese-Australian culture
Methodist denominations
Overseas Chinese organisations